Bicep is the self-titled debut album by electronic music duo Bicep, released on Ninja Tune on 1 September 2017.

Upon its release, Bicep went in at number 20 on the UK Albums Chart. The album received positive reviews on its release, with support from publications such as Pitchfork, The Guardian, Resident Advisor and Mixmag.

Reception 

Pitchfork referred to the album as "a varied document drawing on the rich history and variety of UK dance music, updated with sleek, modern sounds, vibrant psychedelic textures, and impeccable production".

Mixmag referred to it as "laser focused in the pursuit of pleasure" and that Bicep "makes absolute sense as a complete album".

The Guardian noted that the debut album "fitfully lives up to expectations", naming "Aura" as "one of the dance tracks of the year".

Resident Advisor praised the "rich and varied LP", noting "They out do themselves on Bicep... Contemporary, relevant and, most of all, exciting".

Mixmag later placed the album in first place on their list of Top Albums of the Year, referring to the album as "simultaneously classic and undeniably contemporary".

The lead single, "Glue", was voted by the public as DJ Mag's (Best of British) Track of the Year. It also reached number 1 topping Amazon's Best Electronic of 2017. second in Mixmags 100 Best Tracks of 2017, and the Joe Wilson directed video came in at number three in Fact magazine's ten best music videos of 2017.

Track listing 
All tracks written by Andrew Ferguson and Matthew McBriar, except where noted.

Notes
"Spring" contains a sample of "Chalte Chalte Yun Hi Koi" from the soundtrack of Pakeezah, written by Ghulam Mohammed and Kaifi Azmi, and sung by Lata Mangeshkar.
"Rain" contains a sample of "Husn Hazir Hai" from the soundtrack of Laila Majnu, written by Madan Mohan, Jaidev and Sahir Ludhianvi, and sung by Lata Mangeshkar.

Personnel 
Bicep
Andrew Ferguson
Matthew McBriar

Additional personnel
Silkie Carlo – vocals on "Glue"
Rosie Lowe – vocals on "Vale"
Amy Spencer – lyrics and vocals on "Drift" and "Ayr"

Charts

References 

2017 albums
Bicep (duo) albums
Ninja Tune albums